Əskipara may refer to:
Əskipara, Tartar, Azerbaijan
Aşağı Əskipara, Azerbaijan
Yuxarı Əskipara, Azerbaijan